Lurøya may refer to the following places:

Lurøya, Svalbard, an island in Svalbard, Norway
Lurøya, Nordland, an island in Lurøy, Norway
Lurøya, Steigen, an islet in Steigen, Norway